Angelina Lübcke (born 24 February 1991) is a German football player. She plays as a striker for FFV Leipzig

Career

Club

Lübcke played in her adolescence at USC Paloma. At age 16, she was engaged by the Bundesliga club Hamburger SV for the 2007/08 season.

Their first Bundesliga game was disputed on 4 November 2007 (5th Round) goalless draw in the away game against TSV Crailsheim. After four seasons with Hamburg, for which it disputed 45 league games, she moved to the 2007/08 season for Bundesliga 1. FC Lokomotive Leipzig. There are also 15 April 2012 she succeeded (17th matchday), in 2: 9 defeat at home to VfL Wolfsburg, reply with the intermediate 1: 0 in the 1st minute their only Bundesliga goal. After last season, the club was again descended in the 2. Bundesliga North. In the second division season Lübcke completed 21 league games and scored nine goals.

For the 2013/14 season, she signed a contract at second division for SC Sand. However, the change did not come into being, and she returned to 1. FC Lokomotive Leipzig (FFV Leipzig).

National team

As juniors player it belonged to the squad of the German U-17 national team. In U-17 World Cup 2008 in New Zealand she came on November 16, in the match for third place, the 3: 0 win over the selection of England, with Substitutes for Leonie Maier in the 89th minute for their debut. In 2008, she disputed four caps for the U-19 national team, then by 2010 three matches for the U-20 National team.

In 2012, she was part of the squad of the U-23 national team (in the 2:0 win over the selection of Sweden).

Honours

 FIFA U-17 Women's World Cup: Third place 2008

References

External links
Player German domestic football stats  at DFB

1991 births
German women's footballers
Germany women's youth international footballers
Women's association football forwards
Footballers from Hamburg
Living people